is a feminine Japanese given name.

Possible writings
文子 (sentence, child) - also can be read as "Ayako"
富美子 or 冨美子 (wealthy beautiful child)
芙美子 (hibiscus, beautiful child)
史子 (historical child)

People with the name
Fumiko Aoki, a cross-country skier (富美子)
Fumiko Enchi, a writer active in the Shōwa period (文子)
, Japanese writer and poet
, Japanese politician
, Japanese artist
, Japanese long jumper
Fumiko Kaneko, a Japanese anarchist and nihilist  (文子)
Fumiko Kometani, an author and artist (ふみ子)
Fumiko Okuno, a Japanese synchronized swimmer (文子)
Fumiko Orikasa (born 1974), a singer and voice actress (富美子)
, Japanese diplomat
, Japanese swimmer
, Japanese-German classical pianist
Fumiko Yonezawa, physicist

References

Japanese feminine given names